Bardet–Biedl syndrome 10, also known as BBS10 is a human gene.

Function 

The Bardet-Biedl syndrome 10 protein has distant sequence homology to type II chaperonins. As a molecular chaperone, this protein may affect the folding or stability of other ciliary or basal body proteins. Inhibition of this protein's expression impairs ciliogenesis in preadipocytes.

Clinical significance 

Mutations in this gene are associated with the Bardet–Biedl syndrome.

References

Further reading

External links
 GeneReviews/NIH/NCBI/UW entry on Bardet-Biedl Syndrome